Al-Wahda Sports Club is an Omani sports club based in Sur, Oman. The club is currently playing in the First Division League of Oman Football Association. Their home ground is Sur Sports Complex. The stadium is government owned, but they also own their own personal stadium and sports equipment, as well as their own training facilities.

Being a multisport club
Although being mainly known for their football, Al-Wahda SC like many other clubs in Oman, have not only football in their list, but also hockey, volleyball, handball, basketball, badminton and squash. They also have a youth football team competing in the Omani Youth league.

References

External links
Al-Wahda SC Profile at Soccerway.com
Al-Wahda SC Profile at Futbol24.com
Al-Wahda SC Profile at Goalzz.com

Football clubs in Oman
Omani League
Sur, Oman
Association football clubs established in 1970
1970 establishments in Oman